Joseph Andrew Johnson (19 January 1883 23 April 1934) was an Australian rules footballer who played for the Fitzroy Football Club in the Victorian Football League (VFL) and is recognised as the first-ever Indigenous Australian to play in the VFL.

Family
The son of Melbourne-born Andrew Johnson (1840-1891), and Eliza Catherine Louisa Johnson (1843-1909), née Gordon, Joseph Andrew Johnson was born near Newcastle, New South Wales on 19 January 1883.

He married Nora Campion Naismith (1890-1954) in North Carlton on 3 August 1912.

Johnson's son Percy Johnson, grandson Percy Cummings, and great-grandsons Robert and Trent Cummings also played VFL/AFL football.

Johnson has been lauded for his role in being the first known Aboriginal footballer in Victoria, "leading the way" for other Aboriginal players to star in football.

Football

Fitzroy (VFL)
Johnson was recruited from Victorian Football Association (VFA) side Northcote Football Club and made his senior debut for Fitzroy Football Club in Round One 1904 against Carlton. Initially playing as a half-back flanker, Johnson played in back-to-back premiership teams in 1904 and 1905.

Brunswick (VFA)
In 1907, Johnson left Fitzroy for VFA side Brunswick as playing coach, playing in their inaugural premiership in 1909.

Northcote (VFA)
In 1912 he returned to Northcote as playing coach until 1914.

Military service
He enlisted in the First AIF on 10 February 1916.

He was court-martialled in Egypt on 1 August 1916, charged with "striking his superior officer", found guilty, and sentenced to "six calendar months imprisonment with hard labor [sic]"  his incarceration, which commenced on 16 August 1916, was suspended on 15 September 1916.

He served with the AIF in France from November 1916, was transferred to the UK for treatment for "acute nephritis" in February 1917, was repatriated to Australia in July 1917, and was discharged from the AIF on 18 October 1917 on medical grounds.

Death
Johnson died suddenly on 23 April 1934, and his funeral was held the next day in Carlton.

Notes

References
 World War One Embarkation Roll: Private Joseph Andrew Johnson (1663), collection of the Australian War Museum.
 World War One Nominal Roll: Private Joseph Andrew Johnson (1663), collection of the Australian War Museum.
 Private Joseph Andrew Johnson (1663), The AIF Project.
 World War One Service Record: Private Joseph Andrew Johnson (1663), National Archives of Australia.
 Fiddian, M. (2016) The VFA: A History of the Victorian Football Association 1877–1995, Melbourne Sports Books: Melbourne.
 Lambley, Desmond Bruce, March in the Guilty Bastard, Zeus Publications, (Burleigh, Qld), 2012.

External links
 
 
 Joe Johnson, at The VFA Project.

1883 births
1934 deaths
Indigenous Australian players of Australian rules football
Australian rules footballers from New South Wales
Australian rules footballers from Victoria (Australia)
Australian Rules footballers: place kick exponents
Fitzroy Football Club players
Fitzroy Football Club Premiership players
Brunswick Football Club players
Brunswick Football Club coaches
Northcote Football Club players
Northcote Football Club coaches
Two-time VFL/AFL Premiership players